This is a list of 193 species in Nemotelus, a genus of soldier flies in the family Stratiomyidae.

Nemotelus species

Nemotelus abdominalis Adams, 1903
Nemotelus acutirostris Loew, 1863
Nemotelus aerosus Gimmerthal, 1847
Nemotelus albimarginatus James, 1936
Nemotelus albirostris Macquart, 1850
Nemotelus albitarsis Lindner, 1965
Nemotelus albiventris Thomson, 1869
Nemotelus aldrichi (Williston, 1917)
Nemotelus alida Lindner, 1966
Nemotelus anchora Loew, 1846
Nemotelus angustemarginatus Pleske, 1937
Nemotelus annulipes Pleske, 1937
Nemotelus arabistanicus Pleske, 1937
Nemotelus arator Melander, 1903
Nemotelus argentifer Loew, 1846
Nemotelus aridus Hanson, 1963
Nemotelus armeniacus Pleske, 1937
Nemotelus aschuricus Pleske, 1937
Nemotelus atbassaricus Pleske, 1937
Nemotelus atriceps Loew, 1856
Nemotelus aureus Lindner, 1966
Nemotelus aviceps James, 1974
Nemotelus barracloughi (Mason, 1997)
Nemotelus basilaris Woodley, 2001
Nemotelus beameri James, 1933
Nemotelus beckeri Hauser, 1998
Nemotelus bellulus Melander, 1903
Nemotelus biondii Mason, 1997
Nemotelus bipunctatus Loew, 1846
Nemotelus bomynensis Pleske, 1937
Nemotelus bonnarius Johnson, 1912
Nemotelus brevirostris Meigen, 1822
Nemotelus bruesii Melander, 1903
Nemotelus canadensis Loew, 1863
Nemotelus candidus Becker, 1906
Nemotelus capensis Walker, 1851
Nemotelus carthaginis Becker, 1906
Nemotelus catharistis Lindner, 1930
Nemotelus centralis Hanson, 1958
Nemotelus chaineyi Mason, 1997
Nemotelus chilensis James, 1974
Nemotelus chlorhimas James, 1974
Nemotelus cingulatus Dufour, 1852
Nemotelus clunipes Lindner, 1960
Nemotelus cochraneae Mason, 1997
Nemotelus communis Hanson, 1958
Nemotelus congruens Kertész, 1914
Nemotelus consentiens Lindner, 1959
Nemotelus convexiceps James, 1974
Nemotelus crenatus Egger, 1859
Nemotelus crinitus Hanson, 1963
Nemotelus curdistanus Szilády, 1941
Nemotelus cylindricornis Rozkošný, 1977
Nemotelus cypriacus Lindner, 1937
Nemotelus dampfi James, 1941
Nemotelus danielssoni Mason, 1989
Nemotelus dentatus Becker, 1902
Nemotelus diehli Lindner, 1941
Nemotelus dimidiatus Lindner, 1935
Nemotelus dissitus Cui, Zhang & Yang, 2009
Nemotelus eburneopictus James, 1974
Nemotelus exsul James, 1960
Nemotelus exul (Walker, 1851)
Nemotelus faciflavus Cui, Zhang & Yang, 2009
Nemotelus fasciventris Becker, 1913
Nemotelus flavicornis Johnson, 1894
Nemotelus flavocingulatus Kertész, 1914
Nemotelus fozzeri Mason, 1997
Nemotelus frontosus (Hine, 1901)
Nemotelus fuegensis James, 1974
Nemotelus glaber Loew, 1872
Nemotelus gobiensis Pleske, 1937
Nemotelus grootaerti Mason, 1997
Nemotelus haemorrhous Loew, 1857
Nemotelus halophilus Hanson, 1958
Nemotelus hansoni Mason, 1997
Nemotelus heptapotamicus Pleske, 1937
Nemotelus hirsutissimus James, 1974
Nemotelus hirtulus Bigot, 1879
Nemotelus hyalinibasis Lindner, 1966
Nemotelus ilensis Pleske, 1937
Nemotelus imitator (Kertész, 1923)
Nemotelus immaculatus Johnson, 1895
Nemotelus inconspicuus Pleske, 1933
Nemotelus incurvatus James, 1974
Nemotelus insularis Becker, 1908
Nemotelus irwinorum Mason, 1997
Nemotelus jakowlewi Pleske, 1937
Nemotelus jamesi Hanson, 1958
Nemotelus kansensis Adams, 1903
Nemotelus knowltoni James, 1936
Nemotelus kugleri Lindner, 1974
Nemotelus lanatus James, 1974
Nemotelus lasiops Loew, 1846
Nemotelus latemarginatus Pleske, 1937
Nemotelus latiusculus Loew, 1871
Nemotelus lativentris Pleske, 1937
Nemotelus londtorum Mason, 1997
Nemotelus longirostris Wiedemann, 1824
Nemotelus maculatus Kertész, 1914
Nemotelus maculiventris Bigot, 1860
Nemotelus madagascarensis James, 1975
Nemotelus magellanicus James, 1974
Nemotelus mandshuricus Pleske, 1937
Nemotelus marinus Becker, 1902
Nemotelus matilei Mason, 1997
Nemotelus matrouhensis Mohammad, Fadl, Gadalla & Badrawy, 2009
Nemotelus megarhynchus Pleske, 1937
Nemotelus melanderi Banks, 1920
Nemotelus mersinae Becker, 1915
Nemotelus monensis Curran, 1928
Nemotelus mongolia Woodley, 2001
Nemotelus montanus James, 1936
Nemotelus nanshanicus Pleske, 1937
Nemotelus nartshukae Rozkošný & Vanhara, 2018
Nemotelus neotropicus Curran, 1925
Nemotelus neuquenensis Kertész, 1914
Nemotelus nevadensis Hanson, 1963
Nemotelus niger Bigot, 1879
Nemotelus nigribasis Lindner, 1965
Nemotelus nigricornis Kertész, 1914
Nemotelus nigrifrons Loew, 1846
Nemotelus nigrimana Lindner, 1966
Nemotelus nigrinus Fallén, 1817
Nemotelus notatus Zetterstedt, 1842
Nemotelus nudus Kertész, 1914
Nemotelus obscuripes Loew, 1871
Nemotelus obtusirostris Lindner, 1943
Nemotelus pallipes Say, 1823
Nemotelus pantherina (Linnaeus, 1758)
Nemotelus pappi Rozkošný, 1982
Nemotelus penai James, 1974
Nemotelus personatus Pleske, 1937
Nemotelus peruvianus Kertész, 1914
Nemotelus picinus Hanson, 1958
Nemotelus planifrons Lindner, 1972
Nemotelus poecilohimas James, 1974
Nemotelus poecilorhynchus Pleske, 1937
Nemotelus politus Hanson, 1958
Nemotelus polyposus Say, 1829
Nemotelus proboscideus Loew, 1846
Nemotelus przewalskii Pleske, 1937
Nemotelus psilonotus Hanson, 1963
Nemotelus pulchricornis James, 1974
Nemotelus pullus Loew, 1871
Nemotelus pumilus Hanson, 1963
Nemotelus punctifacies Becker, 1913
Nemotelus quadrinotatus Johnson, 1913
Nemotelus robertsonae Mason, 1997
Nemotelus roedingeri Lindner, 1941
Nemotelus rudifranci (Berezovsky & Nartshuk, 1993)
Nemotelus ruficornis Bigot, 1879
Nemotelus rufiventris Portschinsky, 1887
Nemotelus rufoabdominalis Cole, 1923
Nemotelus rugosus James, 1941
Nemotelus rumelicus Beschovski & Manasieva, 1996
Nemotelus sabroskyi Hanson, 1958
Nemotelus shannoni James, 1974
Nemotelus signatus Frivaldszky, 1855
Nemotelus slossonae Johnson, 1895
Nemotelus sordidus Kertész, 1914
Nemotelus stuckenbergi Lindner, 1965
Nemotelus subuliginosus Rozkošný, 1974
Nemotelus svenhedini Lindner, 1933
Nemotelus syriacus Lindner, 1937
Nemotelus tenuistylus Hanson, 1958
Nemotelus tenuivena James, 1974
Nemotelus thomae Curran, 1928
Nemotelus titschacki Lindner, 1941
Nemotelus transsylvanicus (Kertész, 1923)
Nemotelus tristis Bigot, 1887
Nemotelus tschorsnigi (Mason, 1997)
Nemotelus turkestanicus Pleske, 1937
Nemotelus uliginosus (Linnaeus, 1767)
Nemotelus variabilis Hanson, 1958
Nemotelus vertebratus James, 1974
Nemotelus victoriskusnezowi Pleske, 1937
Nemotelus wilfordhansoni Woodley, 2001
Nemotelus xinjiangensis Cui, Zhang & Yang, 2009
Nemotelus zichyi Kertész, 1901

References

Nemotelus